Kootenay East  (name in effect from 2009 onwards, formerly Kootenay from 1966 to 2001 and East Kootenay from 2001 to 2009) is a provincial electoral district for the Legislative Assembly of British Columbia, Canada.  It was created before the 1966 election by the merger of Cranbrook and Fernie ridings, and despite its long period under the "Kootenay" moniker, never extended to cover more than a fraction of the whole "Kootenay" region.

For other historical or current ridings in the Kootenay region, please see Kootenay (electoral districts).

Demographics

Geography 
As of the 2020 provincial election, Kootenay East comprises the southern portion of the Regional District of East Kootenay. It is located in southeastern British Columbia and is bordered by Alberta to the east and Montana, United States to the south. Communities in the electoral district consist of Cranbrook, Fernie, Sparwood, and Elkford.

History

2008 Redistribution
Addition of St. Mary's Indian Reserve. 
Change name from East Kootenay to Kootenay East

1999 Redistribution
Small addition to western border.
Change name from Kootenay to East Kootenay

Member of Legislative Assembly 
Its MLA is Tom Shypitka. He was first elected in 2017. This riding has elected the following MLAs:

Election results 

|-

|-
 
|NDP
|Erda Walsh
|align="right"|7,339
|align="right"|43.72%
|align="right"|
|align="right"|$54,902

|- style="background:white;"
! style="text-align:right;" colspan="3"|Total Valid Votes
!align="right"|16,788
!align="right"|100%
|- style="background:white;"
! style="text-align:right;" colspan="3"|Total Rejected Ballots
!align="right"|111
!align="right"|0.66%
|- style="background:white;"
! style="text-align:right;" colspan="3"|Turnout
!align="right"|16,899
!align="right"|60.03%
|}

|-

|-
 
|NDP
|Erda Walsh
|align="right"|3,638
|align="right"|22.05%
|align="right"|
|align="right"|$41,196

|-
 
|NDP
|Erda Walsh
|align="right"|6,398
|align="right"|38.59%
|align="right"|
|align="right"|$50,043

|-

|Independent
|Marko Makar
|align="right"|215
|align="right"|1.30%
|align="right"|
|align="right"|$2,707

|-
 
|NDP
|Anne Edwards
|align="right"|7,352
|align="right"|46.49%
|align="right"|
|align="right"|$44,609

|-

|-

|Liberal
|Paul R. Kershaw
|align="right"|539
|align="right"|3.23%
|align="right"|
|align="right"|unknown

|Progressive Conservative
|James G. Smith
|align="right"|499
|align="right"|2.99%
|align="right"|
|align="right"|unknown
|- bgcolor="white"
!align="right" colspan=3|Total valid votes
!align="right"|16,687 	
!align="right"|100.00%
!align="right"|
|- bgcolor="white"
!align="right" colspan=3|Total rejected ballots
!align="right"|271
!align="right"|
!align="right"|
|- bgcolor="white"
!align="right" colspan=3|Turnout
!align="right"|%
!align="right"|
!align="right"|
|}

|-

|Liberal
|Kory Palmer
|align="right"|347
|align="right"|1.99%
|align="right"|
|align="right"|unknown
|- bgcolor="white"
!align="right" colspan=3|Total valid votes
!align="right"|17,411
!align="right"|100.00%
!align="right"|
|- bgcolor="white"
!align="right" colspan=3|Total rejected ballots
!align="right"|208
!align="right"|
!align="right"|
|- bgcolor="white"
!align="right" colspan=3|Turnout
!align="right"|%
!align="right"|
!align="right"|
|}

|-

|Progressive Conservative
|Roy Wilburn Paul
|align="right"|975
|align="right"|7.80%
|align="right"|
|align="right"|unknown
|- bgcolor="white"
!align="right" colspan=3|Total valid votes
!align="right"|12,492
!align="right"|100.00%
!align="right"|
|- bgcolor="white"
!align="right" colspan=3|Total rejected ballots
!align="right"|102
!align="right"|
!align="right"|
|- bgcolor="white"
!align="right" colspan=3|Turnout
!align="right"|%
!align="right"|
!align="right"|
|}

|-

|- bgcolor="white"
!align="right" colspan=3|Total valid votes
!align="right"|15,138
!align="right"|100.00%
!align="right"|
|- bgcolor="white"
!align="right" colspan=3|Total rejected ballots
!align="right"|180
!align="right"|
!align="right"|
|- bgcolor="white"
!align="right" colspan=3|Turnout
!align="right"|%
!align="right"|
!align="right"|
|}

|-

|Liberal
|Harry Edwards Caldwell
|align="right"|4,267
|align="right"|38.26%
|align="right"|
|align="right"|unknown

|Conservative
|David John Reeves
|align="right"|4,169
|align="right"|30.38%
|align="right"|
|align="right"|unknown

|- bgcolor="white"
!align="right" colspan=3|Total valid votes
!align="right"|13,721	
!align="right"|100.00%
!align="right"|
|- bgcolor="white"
!align="right" colspan=3|Total rejected ballots
!align="right"|180
!align="right"|
!align="right"|
|- bgcolor="white"
!align="right" colspan=3|Turnout
!align="right"|%
!align="right"|
!align="right"|
|}

|-

|Social Credit
|Harry J. Broadhurst
|align="right"|4,267
|align="right"|38.26%
|align="right"|
|align="right"|unknown

|Liberal
|Henry Nelson
|align="right"|2,604
|align="right"|23.55%
|align="right"|
|align="right"|unknown
|- bgcolor="white"
!align="right" colspan=3|Total valid votes
!align="right"|11,153 	
!align="right"|100.00%
!align="right"|
|- bgcolor="white"
!align="right" colspan=3|Total rejected ballots
!align="right"|173
!align="right"|
!align="right"|
|- bgcolor="white"
!align="right" colspan=3|Turnout
!align="right"|%
!align="right"|
!align="right"|
|}

|-

|Liberal
|Harry McKay
|align="right"|2,123
|align="right"|24.13%
|align="right"|
|align="right"|unknown
|- bgcolor="white"
!align="right" colspan=3|Total valid votes
!align="right"|8,798
!align="right"|100.00%
!align="right"|
|- bgcolor="white"
!align="right" colspan=3|Total rejected ballots
!align="right"|54
!align="right"|
!align="right"|
|- bgcolor="white"
!align="right" colspan=3|Turnout
!align="right"|%
!align="right"|
!align="right"|
|}

References

External links 
BC Stats Profile 2001
Results of 2001 election (pdf)
2001 Expenditures
Results of 1996 election
1996 Expenditures
Results of 1991 election
1991 Expenditures
Website of the Legislative Assembly of British Columbia
Elections British Columbia historical returns

British Columbia provincial electoral districts
Cranbrook, British Columbia